Phaedropsis collustralis is a moth in the family Crambidae. It was described by Heinrich Benno Möschler in 1886. It is found in Jamaica.

References

Spilomelinae
Moths described in 1886